The Gift is an album by saxophonist David "Fathead" Newman which was recorded in 2002 and released on the HighNote label the following year.

Reception

In his review on Allmusic, Scott Yanow states "Veteran saxophonist David "Fathead" Newman shows off his versatility on this pleasing soul-jazz date. He plays tenor on four selections and flute on two others, and switches to soprano and alto for one song apiece. ... this CD finds Fathead in prime form, and it is easily recommended to fans of his straight-ahead dates". In JazzTimes, David Franklin noted "At age 70, veteran saxophonist David “Fathead” Newman has not even begun to slow down. The Gift (HighNote) finds him still in command of all his considerable talents in a showcase for his soul-drenched tenor, some boppish alto, a bit of funky flute and some meditative soprano".

Track listing 
All compositions by David "Fathead" Newman except where noted
 "The Gift" – 5:44
 "Don't Let the Sun Catch You Crying" (Gerry Marsden, Freddie Marsden, Les Chadwick, Les Maguire) – 7:14
 "Off the Hook" – 5:14	
 "Unspeakable Times" – 6:23
 "Little Sonny's Tune" – 3:55
 "Lady Day" (L. Johnson) – 6:15
 "Unchain My Heart" (Bobby Sharp, Teddy Powell) – 5:38
 "Ksue" – 8:36

Personnel 
David "Fathead" Newman – tenor saxophone, alto saxophone, flute
John Hicks – piano 
Bryan Carrott – vibraphone
Buster Williams – bass 
Winard Harper – drums

References 

David "Fathead" Newman albums
2002 albums
HighNote Records albums